Dean Bank is situated on the west incline of Ferryhill, County Durham, in England.

References

Villages in County Durham